K-Bar Ranch is a census-designated place (CDP) in Jim Wells County, Texas, United States. The population was 358 at the 2010 census.

Geography
K-Bar Ranch is located in northeastern Jim Wells County at  (27.996465, -97.922898). Texas State Highway 359 forms the southeastern border of the community.

Demographics
As of the census of 2000, there were 350 people, 99 households, and 89 families residing in the CDP. The population density was 102.6 people per square mile (39.6/km2). There were 116 housing units at an average density of 34.0/sq mi (13.1/km2). The racial makeup of the CDP was 86.29% White, 0.29% Native American, 12.86% from other races, and 0.57% from two or more races. Hispanic or Latino of any race were 83.43% of the population.

There were 99 households, out of which 55.6% had children under the age of 18 living with them, 70.7% were married couples living together, 13.1% had a female householder with no husband present, and 9.1% were non-families. 6.1% of all households were made up of individuals, and 4.0% had someone living alone who was 65 years of age or older. The average household size was 3.54 and the average family size was 3.69.

In the CDP, the population was spread out, with 38.6% under the age of 18, 7.7% from 18 to 24, 26.6% from 25 to 44, 17.4% from 45 to 64, and 9.7% who were 65 years of age or older. The median age was 28 years. For every 100 females, there were 92.3 males. For every 100 females age 18 and over, there were 92.0 males.

The median income for a household in the CDP was $29,205, and the median income for a family was $28,409. Males had a median income of $23,173 versus $23,750 for females. The per capita income for the CDP was $7,450. About 26.2% of families and 34.3% of the population were below the poverty line, including 43.9% of those under age 18 and none of those age 65 or over.

Education
K-Bar Ranch is served by the Orange Grove Independent School District.

References

Census-designated places in Jim Wells County, Texas
Census-designated places in Texas